Khosrowabad (also Romanized as Khosrowābād; also known as Khosrowābād-e Amīrī) is a village in Ordughesh Rural District, Zeberkhan District, Nishapur County, Razavi Khorasan Province, Iran. At the 2006 census, its population was 92, in 20 families.

References 

Populated places in Nishapur County